Gaines African Methodist Episcopal Church, is a historic African Methodist Episcopal Church located at 7134 Montgomery Rd road in Elkridge, Maryland.

The building was constructed in 1893.

See also

Asbury Methodist Episcopal Church (Annapolis Junction, Maryland)
Brown Chapel United Methodist Church
Daisy United Methodist Church
First Baptist Church of Elkridge
Hopkins United Methodist Church
Locust United Methodist Church
Mt. Moriah Lodge No. 7
St. Stephens African Methodist Episcopal Church
West Liberty United Methodist Church

References

African-American history of Howard County, Maryland
Howard County, Maryland landmarks
Churches completed in 1893
African Methodist Episcopal churches in Maryland
Elkridge, Maryland